Juan Arredondo Chavez (10 November 1934 – 13 December 2022) was a Mexican tennis player.

Arredondo partnered with Vicente Zarazúa in doubles to win a gold medal at the 1962 Central American and Caribbean Games and a silver medal at the 1963 Pan American Games.

In Vancouver in 1963, Arredondo made his only Davis Cup appearance for Mexico, for a tie against Canada. He played in the reverse singles, a dead rubber which he lost to Keith Carpenter in five sets.

His son, Juan Carlos, competed on the professional tour and was a 2001 Universiade doubles champion.

See also
List of Mexico Davis Cup team representatives

References

External links
 
 

1934 births
2022 deaths
Mexican male tennis players
Tennis players at the 1963 Pan American Games
Pan American Games medalists in tennis
Pan American Games silver medalists for Mexico
Competitors at the 1962 Central American and Caribbean Games
Central American and Caribbean Games medalists in tennis
Central American and Caribbean Games gold medalists for Mexico
Central American and Caribbean Games silver medalists for Mexico
Medalists at the 1963 Pan American Games
20th-century Mexican people